Tinissa yaloma is a moth of the family Tineidae. It was described by Robinson in 1981. It is found in New Britain.

References

Moths described in 1981
Scardiinae